Heiberg is an unincorporated community in Norman County, in the U.S. state of Minnesota.

History
A post office was established at Heiberg in 1888, and remained in operation until it was discontinued in 1916. The community was named for Jorgen F. Heiberg, the owner of a local gristmill.

References

Unincorporated communities in Norman County, Minnesota
Unincorporated communities in Minnesota